Maktampur is a census town in Bharuch district in the Indian state of Gujarat.

Demographics
 India census, Maktampur had a population of 9245. Males constitute 52% of the population and females 48%. Maktampur has an average literacy rate of 78%, higher than the national average of 59.5%: male literacy is 82%, and female literacy is 73%. In Maktampur, 12% of the population is under 6 years of age.

References

Cities and towns in Bharuch district